Admiralty House is the Sydney official residence of the governor-general of Australia. It is located in the suburb of Kirribilli, on the northern foreshore of Sydney Harbour (adjacent to Kirribilli House, which is the Sydney official residence of the Australian Prime Minister). This large Victorian Regency and Italianate sandstone manor, completed in stages based on designs by James Barnet and Walter Liberty Vernon, occupies the tip of Kirribilli Point. Once known as "Wotonga", it has commanding views across Sydney Harbour to the Sydney Harbour Bridge and the Sydney Opera House.

Its current name originates in the fact that it served as the residence for the Commander-in-Chief of the Royal Navy's Australia Squadron from 1885 to 1913.

The original building on the site was completed, as a private dwelling, in mid-to-late 1843, by John George Nathaniel Gibbes, the then Collector of Customs for New South Wales and a member of the New South Wales Legislative Council. A portrait of Gibbes, painted in 1808, hangs in the house.

On 22 June 2004 Admiralty House was placed on the Commonwealth Heritage List.

History

Early history
Before the arrival of British settlers in Sydney Harbour, the Aboriginal Cammeraygal people lived along the Kirribilli and Milsons Point foreshores, and in the surrounding bushland. The area was a fertile fishing ground, and the name Kirribilli is derived from the Aboriginal word kiarabilli, which means "good fishing spot". The name Cammeraygal is displayed on the North Sydney Municipal Council emblem, and also gave name to the suburb of Cammeray.

Kirribilli was settled early in the history of the Colony. Lightfoot was a former convict, born in about 1763 and transported to Australia for seven years for stealing clothing. He arrived with the First Fleet in 1788 on the Charlotte.

In 1794 Thomas Muir, a Scottish constitutional reformer, was sentenced to transportation for sedition. Thomas Muir purchased Lightfoot's farm. Muir also had a cottage on what is now Circular Quay. It is likely that the farm was located at the Jeffrey Street end of Kirribilli (not near Admiralty house) and was named "Huntershill" by Thomas Muir, after his father's home in Scotland. Thomas Muir escaped from the colony in 1796 aboard an American brig, the Otter.

Four years later the Colonial Secretary recorded that the land grant to Lightfoot was cancelled and given to Robert Ryan in 1800 with no mention of the intermediate (private) sale to Muir. Ryan had worked in Norfolk Island, both as a soldier and also a settler. The  of Lightfoot's Grant was cancelled and included in a  grant to Ryan for his service in the Royal Marines and the NSW Corps. The corresponding entry in the Register of Land Grants states  Cancelled, and a New Grant given to Robert Ryan for 90 acres in addition to this Allotment, by Governor Hunter. See the third Register, Folio 37. This grant to Ryan included almost all Kirribilli and later maps referred. By 1801, the property had passed into the hands of Robert Campbell, a wealthy Sydney merchant. Campbell built Australia's first shipbuilding yards in 1807, at the site that is now occupied by the Royal Sydney Yacht Squadron, Kirribilli. Part of the land in Kirribilli was also briefly used for quarantine purposes in 1814 for the convict ship Surry. Over 46 persons had died during the voyage of typhoid including 36 convicts.

Campbell's property in Kirribilli was used for grazing under lease to Campbell's friend James Milson, hence the name "Milson's Point". Milson's Point is the next point along from Kirribilli point, where the Sydney Harbour Bridge now crosses the harbour. A plan of sub-division was drawn up in the 1840s by Campbell. In 1842, the  site where Admiralty House now sits was leased to the Collector of Customs for the Colony, Lieutenant-Colonel (later full Colonel) Gibbes, MLC. Gibbes intended to build a private home on the site. (Since his arrival in the colony in 1834, Gibbes and his family had been living in Henrietta Villa, also known as the Naval Villa, on Sydney's Point Piper, under a leasehold arrangement.)

Private residence

On the superb Kirribilli Point location, Gibbes erected, between 1842 and 1843, a graceful single-storey house with wide verandahs and elegant French doors. Gibbes designed the house, which he called "Wotonga" (or "Woottonga"), himself. The stone for the house's walls was quarried locally and the hardwood and cedar joinery came from George Coleson's timber-yard in George Street, Sydney. Gibbes engaged James Hume, a well-known builder who dabbled in ecclesiastical architecture, to supervise the construction of the building and its stables. Gibbes, however, hired his own masons, bricklayers, carpenters, plumbers and ironmongers to work on the project, paying each of them separately as work progressed. Gibbes used the Custom Department's cutter to commute to and from the building site. Once completed, Gibbes' L-shaped residence featured a plain, yet stylish, double façade to maximise the building's magnificent, sweeping views across Sydney Harbour. These views enabled Gibbes to monitor shipping traffic in and out of Darling Harbour and, more importantly, Circular Quay, where the Sydney Customs House was situated.

Today, Wotonga forms the core of Admiralty House and the building's 180-degree, east–west panoramic sight-lines are even more spectacular than they were in Gibbes' day, owing to the subsequent high-rise growth of Sydney's CBD.

Gibbes, incidentally, was said to be the illegitimate child of His Royal Highness Frederick, Duke of York, (King George III's second son). This reputed connection to the British monarchy adds spice to the house on Kirribilli Point's subsequent role as a vice-regal establishment.

In 1849, Robert Campbell died and the executors of the estate sold the property, comprising the house and  land, to Gibbes for about A£1,400. On 27 December 1851, Gibbes, who was contemplating a departure from the Customs Service at the age of 64, sold the property to James Lindsay Travers, a merchant of Macquarie Place, Sydney, for £1,533. (Gibbes subsequently changed his mind about leaving his position as head of the NSW Customs Department; instead, he leased Greycliffe House at Shark Beach, Vaucluse, from the Wentworth family and remained in Sydney for the better part of eight years, eventually retiring to Yarralumla homestead, now the official Canberra residence of the Governor-General of Australia, in 1859.)

On this land, Kirribilli House was built in neo-Gothic style . Kirribilli House, situated next door to Admiralty House, serves today as the official Sydney residence of the Prime Minister of Australia.

Crimean War interlude
In 1855, during the Crimean War, Governor William Denison reclaimed the tip of Kirribilli Point, on which fortifications were built. These fortifications, along with Fort Denison, were intended to strengthen the defences of Sydney Harbour, as it was feared that the Russians might attack. In 1856, Lieutenant-Colonel George Barney, a Royal Engineers officer, lived in "Wotonga" and designed and supervised the installation of a battery of five,  muzzle-loading guns on Kirribilli Point, as well as constructing the martello tower at Fort Denison.

Lassetter, Wilshire, and Cadell

In 1856, Lieutenant-Colonel Barney bought the house and its grounds so that he could view all of the sites that he had fortified. In September 1860, Barney sold the house and grounds for £9,000 to George Alfred Lloyd. In 1866, it was let to Frederick Lassetter and subsequently to James Robert Wilshire, a former Lord Mayor of Sydney and a Member of the New South Wales Legislative Council from 1858 to 1861.

In April 1874, Wotonga House was auctioned and bought for £10,100 by Thomas Cadell, a Sydney merchant and member of the New South Wales Legislative Council from 1881 to 1896. At that time, the house was described as possessing a wide verandah, a spacious entrance hall, drawing and dining rooms, 10 bedrooms and the "'usual rooms"" in the main part of the house, as well as having a large courtyard, servant's rooms, kitchen, stables, etc., with an abundant water supply, which never failed in the driest weather.

Admiralty
In 1885, the Royal Navy's Australian Squadron was raised to the status of an Admiral's command in recognition of the colony's growing importance. The colonial government bought "Wotonga" as residence for the Admiral of the Navy. The house was renamed "Admiralty House" and additions were made to the property. A second storey was added to the house, as was a colonnaded verandah. A neo-Gothic style gate lodge was also added to the grounds, as was a covered Admiral's Walk leading down to the berth for the Admiral's barge below.

In 1913, this part of the history of Admiralty House came to a close when the last British admiral left the house and the Royal Australian Navy took over responsibility for the naval defence of Australia.

From the Federation of Australia in 1901, the Government House of New South Wales in Farm Cove was used as the Sydney residence of the Governor-General. In 1912, the Government of New South Wales decided to put the building to public purposes once more, leaving the Governor-General of the period, Lord Denman, without a Sydney residence.

Government House
With the departure of the last British Admiral from Admiralty House in 1913, the Admiralty handed the house back to the New South Wales Government. This provided Lord Denman's successor, Sir Ronald Munro Ferguson, with a Sydney residence. Admiralty House was the residence of the Governors-General for the following fifteen years. 

In 1930, during the Great Depression, the Scullin Government had Admiralty House closed, and its contents were sold at Auction in 1931. Governor-General Sir Isaac Isaacs, appointed in 1931, was the first Governor-General to live permanently at Yarralumla, in Canberra. During his term, Admiralty House remained empty and neglected. Sir Isaac described it in 1934 as being "stripped of its glamour, with no furnishings but a few fine mirrors, its garden wild and overgrown". In 1936, the State of New South Wales reopened Admiralty House as the Sydney residence for the new Governor-General, Lord Gowrie. The house has been used ever since as a vice-regal establishment.

Formal title to Admiralty House finally passed from the State Government to the Commonwealth by Crown grant in 1948, on the condition that the house was to be used only as a residence for the Governor-General.

Functions

Admiralty House is an official residence of the Governor-General of Australia, and accommodates important overseas visitors to Sydney. The Royal Family and other dignitaries, such as the President of the United States and the Pope, are entertained at Admiralty House when they are in Sydney.

Admiralty House, its grounds, and Kirribilli House are usually open to the public once a year, sometime in spring when the gardens are at their best. Security concerns caused the cancellation of openings from 2001 to 2005.

Architecture

Interior
The ground floor of the house contains a vestibule and hallway, two reception rooms, a dining-room, a study and an elaborate central staircase. The residents' private rooms are on the upper floors. A landing on the staircase features elaborate stained glass panels in its windows. Kitchens and other service areas are housed in a wing added to the original structure. A stone gatehouse guards the front entrance to the establishment.

The house is furnished extensively with colonial furniture, porcelain, ornaments and numerous historical artworks such as portraits of Captain James Cook and some former Governors-General, including Hallam Tennyson, 2nd Baron Tennyson. Many of these items were acquired for the nation by The Australiana Fund.

See also

Government Houses of Australia
Government Houses of the British Empire
Governor-General of Australia

References

Bibliography
 Clifford-Smith, Silas; 'Admiralty House', Oxford Companion to Australian Gardens, South Melbourne, 2002
 Kerr, John Semple, Admiralty House: A Conservation Plan Developed for the Department of Housing and Construction, Sydney, 1987
 Messent, David & McGonigal, David; The Complete Guide to Sydney Harbour; David Messent Photography, 1994
 Steele, Jeremy, Sydney Cove to the Heads; The University of Sydney, 1978
 Stephensen, PR & Kennedy, Brian; The History and Description of Sydney Harbour; Reed Publishing, 1966 & 1980
 Thompson, CJ; Admiralty House, Sydney – Brief History and Catalogue of Contents of State Rooms; Government House, Canberra, 1984

External links

 The Governor General of the Commonwealth of Australia: The History of Admiralty House: 1794–1948
 The Australiana Fund: Admiralty House 
 North Sydney Council: The Face of North Sydney Image Library

Official residences in Australia
Sydney
Buildings of the Australian government
Government of Australia
1843 establishments in Australia
Commonwealth Heritage List places in New South Wales
Walter Liberty Vernon buildings in Sydney
James Barnet buildings in Sydney
Italianate architecture in Sydney
Victorian Regency architecture in New South Wales
Government buildings in Sydney
Houses in Kirribilli